The Godovič Pass is a mountain pass in Slovenia's traditional Inner Carniola region between Ajdovščina and Črni Vrh. It connects the Slovenian Prealps with the Dinaric Alps and conventionally represents the southeastern end of the Alps, as the Bocchetta di Altare represents the opposite end of the range.

References

See also 
 Godovič

Mountain passes of Slovenia
Mountain passes of the Dinaric Alps
Mountain passes of the Alps